Jill Gilmore (née Corner) (born 5 April 1973) is an association football player who represented New Zealand at international level.

Gilmore made her Football Ferns as a substitute in a 7–0 win over Trinidad & Tobago on 8 August 1993, and finished her international career with 17 caps to her credit.

She co-coaches Auckland in the New Zealand National Women's Soccer League.

References

1973 births
Living people
New Zealand women's association footballers
New Zealand women's international footballers
Women's association football defenders